The Thai League 1, often referred to as T1, is the top level of the Thai football league system. Contested by 16 clubs, it operates on a system of promotion and relegation with Thai League 2. Seasons run from August to May, with each team playing 30 games (playing all 15 other teams both home and away). It is sponsored by Toyota Motor Thailand and therefore officially known as the Hilux Revo Thai League. In the Thai League, most of the games are played during Saturdays and Sundays, with a few games played on Wednesdays and Fridays.

History

Origins 

Thailand has had league-football competition since 1916. Before the inception of the Thai League, the highest level of club football was the semi-professional league Kor Royal Cup which was contested in a tournament format from 1916 to 1995.

Foundation 

Thai League was introduced in 1996 by the Football Association of Thailand (FAT) under the name Thailand Soccer League. Eighteen clubs who earlier competed for the Kor Royal Cup were registered to play in the first edition of a double round-robin league system. Bangkok Bank was crowned as the first champion of the 1996–97 Thailand Soccer League.

The Thai League originally had 10 to 12 clubs each season until 2007, when it was expanded to 16 clubs. At the end of each season, the three bottom placed clubs are relegated to the Thai Division 1 League.

Leagues integration (2007) 

Most of Thai League clubs in that time were the organisation of government authorities club that based in Greater Bangkok and Metropolitan. Meanwhile, the other local clubs had competed in the semi-pro league called the Provincial League. Thai Premier League faced the issue of low attendance and lack of local loyalties while the Provincial league suffered the financial issue. In 2007, Thai League was integrated with Provincial League completely. Chonburi from the Provincial League was the first champion of the new Thailand Premier League in 2007 season.

Modern era (2009)

In 2009 season, there were significant changes in the lead to the new era of the Thai Premier League. Asian Football Confederation declared the regulations for the associations that have the intention to send the clubs to compete in AFC Champions League starting from 2011. Football Association of Thailand had to establish Thai Premier League co.ltd and forced the clubs in the top league to complete AFC Club License Criteria otherwise Thai clubs will not eligible to play in the Champions League. Clubs were forced to separate themselves from the parent organisations and registered as the independent football authorities.

The massive changes occurred in that season. Thailand Premier League renamed to Thai Premier League. Two times league champion Krung Thai Bank failed to complete the new regulations. The organisation decided to sell the club. The club was acquired by Boon Rawd and rebranded to be Bangkok Glass. Bangkok University had expelled their football club section. The club rebrand itself to Bangkok United since then. The organisation-based clubs had to relocate to find the local supporters to backup the clubs. Osotspa changed their home stadium to Saraburi Province, TOT moved to play in Kanchanaburi, Royal Navy played in Rayong Province while Thailand Tobacco Monopoly integrated to Samut Sakhon Province and rebranded to TTM Samut Sakhon.

Muangthong United were promoted from Thai Division 1 League in that season and won Thai Premier League in their first year in the top league.

Thailand Clasico

Thailand Clasico or The Classic Match of Thailand is the matchup between Muangthong United and Chonburi. It is the matchup that presents Thai football in the modern era. The name was given to the encounter of two teams due to the hype and massive atmosphere around the match. The first encounter between them happened in the 2009 Thai Premier League season. On 30 May 2009, Chonburi that was regarded as the best club in Thailand at that moment hosted the new powerhouse who were just promoted from Division 1 Muangthong United. The match was played at Nong Prue Stadium, Pattaya. Before the match, Chonburi was the leader in the table after 10 matches of the season while Muangthong followed in second with one less point. Chonburi made the lead by 2–0 in the first thirty minutes but Muangthong bounced back to win by the 5–2 result at the end. The match was full of the exciting and dramatic moments. Then, it was considered one of the most classic matches in Thai League history. The Muangthong versus Chonburi matchup was dubbed as "Thailand Clasico" ever since then.

The first invincible

In 2012 season, Muangthong United under Serbian head coach Slaviša Jokanović, had become the first club in the league history that completed the season with an unbeaten record. Muangthong finished at the top of the final standing with 25 wins and 9 draws.

Buriram dominance

The Buriram Dominance refers to the 2013 to 2015 season, which Buriram United won Thai Premier League in three consecutive seasons as the first club in the league history. The three titles in that period included two invincible titles which Buriram United completed Thai Premier League campaign unbeaten in 2013 and 2015 season.

Rebranding (2017)
In 2017, Football Association of Thailand decided to rebrand Thai Premier League into Thai League 1. Since its inception in 1996 the Thai Premier League has relied upon local sponsorship. Re-branding initiatives seek to foster an international identity for the Thai and elevate the league globally through commitment to world class level management and marketing which incorporates multifaceted promotion through various media in order to draw attention to league competition and cups. This rebranding earned the Good Design Award in the Brand Identity branch from the Japan Institute of Design Promotion.

Clubs 
There are 16 clubs in the league, with three promoted teams from Thai League 2 replacing the three teams that were relegated from the 2021-22 season.

Suphanburi, Samut Prakan City and Chiangmai United were relegated at the end of the 2021-22 season after finishing in the bottom three places of the table. They were replaced by 2021-22 Thai League 2 champions Lamphun Warriors. They were joined by runners-up Sukhothai, who also got promoted back after relegated one season before, and Lampang, promotion plays-off winner.

Stadiums and Locations(2022–23) 

Note: Table lists in alphabetical order.

Champions

Wins by club

The Invincibles
Unbeatable champions:
 Muangthong United in 2012
 Buriram United in 2013 and 2015

Records

All-time top scorers 

Figures for active players (in bold).

Most appearances 

Figures for active players (in bold) .

Player statistics
 Youngest player: Suphanat Mueanta (Buriram United) – 15 years, 8 months and 22 days (25 April 2018, Buriram United 2–1 Nakhon Ratchasima, 2018 Thai League 1)
 Oldest player: Somchai Subpherm (TOT) – 51 years, 7 months and 25 days (3 November 2013, Buriram United 2–1 TOT, 2013 Thai Premier League)
 Youngest scorer: Suphanat Mueanta (Buriram United) – 15 years, 9 months and 25 days (26 May 2018, Buriram United 5–0 Air Force Central, 2018 Thai League 1)
 Oldest scorer: Therdsak Chaiman (Chonburi) – 40 years, 8 months and 24 days (2 June 2014, TOT 1–1 Chonburi, 2014 Thai Premier League)
 Fastest scorer: Nirut Kamsawad (Port Authority) – 9 seconds (2001–02 Thai League)
 Most consecutive matches scored: 10 games – Diogo Luís Santo (Buriram United) (24 September 2017 – 2 March 2018, 2018 Thai League 1)
 Most consecutive unconceded matches: 6 games
 Siwarak Tedsungnoen (Buriram United, 2014)
 Kawin Thamsatchanan (Muangthong United, 2016)
 Kawin Thamsatchanan (Muangthong United, 2017)
 All-time most clean sheets: 815 minutes – Siwarak Tedsungnoen
 Most goals in a season: 38 goals – Dragan Bošković (Bangkok United, 2017)
 Most assists in a season: 19 assists – Theerathon Bunmathan (Buriram United, 2015)
 Most titles won: 8 times – Jakkaphan Kaewprom
 Most seasons appeared: 19 seasons – Amnaj Kaewkiew (1996–2014)
 All-time record for highest football transfer fee Thai players: 50 million baht – Tanaboon Kesarat (2017), Worachit Kanitsribampen (2021)

Awards

Prize money 

 Champion: 10,000,000 Baht
 Runner-up: 3,000,000
 Third place: 1,500,000
 Fourth place: 800,000
 Fifth place: 700,000
 Sixth place: 600,000
 Seventh place: 500,000
 Eighth place : 400,000

Trophy 
 2011 – 2016 trophy: In 2010, Football Association of Thailand and Thai Premier League Co. Ltd considered to improve the image of Thai Premier League Trophy. The trophy itself was designed by Glue Creative from England and produced by British Silverware of Sheffield. The trophy was crafted by silver with the European style of a crown. Three divas are holding up the trophy and three golden elephants are standing on the base. The trophy is 75 cm tall and weighs more than 30 kg. The production used 250-man hours of work and the finished trophy worth 2 million baht.
 2017 – current trophy: In 2017, Football Association of Thailand order the trophy produced from England that was created by Royal Jewellers Asprey of London to be new champions trophy. The trophy reflecting Thai identity by the use of Kranok pattern mixed with modern pattern and sculpt it pieces by piece.

Top scorers

Player of the Year

Young Player of the Year

Coach of the Year

Competition format and sponsorship

Competition 
There are 16 clubs in the Thai League. During the course of a season, which lasts from August to May, each club plays the others twice, once at their home stadium and once at that of their opponents, for a total of 30 games. Teams receive three points for a win and one point for a draw. No points are awarded for a loss. Teams are ranked by total points, then head-to-head, then goal difference, and then goals scored. At the end of each season, the club with the most points is crowned champion. If points are equal, the head-to-head, the goal difference and then goals scored determine the winner. If still equal, teams are deemed to occupy the same position. If there is a tie for the championship, for relegation, or for qualification to other competitions, a play-off match at a neutral venue decides rank. The three lowest placed teams are relegated into the Thai League 2 and the top three teams from the Thai League 2 are promoted in their place.

Qualification for Asian competitions 

In the past the champions will play in AFC Champions League playoffs and AFC Cup for the champions of Thai FA Cup. Due to reforms from the AFC for the AFC Champions League and AFC Cup format, there will be no more a direct qualification spot for the AFC Champions League for that Thai Champion, for the time being. From 2012 Thai clubs has 1 automatic spot to the group stage and 1 playoff spot for the Thai FA Cup Winners and 1 playoff spot for the thai league runner-up. But since 
2021, Thai clubs have 2 group stage spot for League Champion and FA Cup winner and 2 teams in play-off spot for Runner-up and Third in the league.

Ranking

To be used for allocating slots in the 2024–25 season.

Updated on 25 May 2022.(Source)

Thai League All-Star Exhibition game

Sponsorship 
The Thai League has been sponsored since 1996 until 2003 and has been sponsored again since 2010. The sponsor has been able to determine the league's sponsorship name. The list below details who the sponsors have been and what they called the competition:
 1996–1997: Johnnie Walker (Johnnie Walker Thailand Soccer League)
 1998–2000: Caltex (Caltex Premier League)
 2001–2003: Advanced Info Service (GSM Thai League)
 2003–2005: None (Thai League)
 2006–2008: None (Thailand Premier League)
 2009: None (Thai Premier League)
 2010–2012: Sponsor (Sponsor Thai Premier League)
 2013–present: Toyota (Toyota Thai Premier League in 2013–2015, Toyota Thai League in 2016–2020-21, Hilux Revo Thai League in 2021-22–present)

Match balls 
The 2021–2028 season uses the Molten.

Youth League 

Like the reserve league, the youth league is open to all the youth teams of all professional clubs in Thailand.

Other tournaments
Domestic tournaments
 Chang FA Cup (1975–2001, 2009–present)
 Thailand Champions Cup (as Kor Royal Cup 1996–2016) (2017–present)
 Toyota League Cup (1987–1994, 2010–present)

International tournaments
 AFC Champions League (1967–1971, 1985–present)
 AFC Cup (2007, 2009–2012)
 ASEAN Club Championship (2003–2005, 2020–present)

Defunct tournaments
 Kor Royal Cup (1916–2016)
 Khǒr Royal Cup (1916–2015)
 Khor Royal Cup (1962–2015)
 Ngor Royal Cup (1962–2015)
 Toyota Premier Cup (2011–2017)
 Mekong Club Championship (2015–2017)

Ranking Asian

Asia Football / Soccer Clubs Ranking

See also 
 Football records in Thailand
 List of Thai League 1 players
 List of Thai League 1 managers
 List of foreign Thai League 1 players
 List of foreign Thai League 1 managers

Notes

References

External links 

 Official Website 
 Official Website 
 Football Association of Thailand 
 Thai League Football
 The Football History Association of Thailand 
 Thai League FIFA
 Thai League 
 Thai League.com
 RSSSF.com – Thailand – List of Champions

 
1
Thailand
1996 establishments in Thailand
Sports leagues established in 1996
Professional sports leagues in Thailand